Jack Edwards was a footballer who played in the Football League for Rotherham United and guested for Stoke City

References

English footballers
Rotherham United F.C. players
Stoke City F.C. wartime guest players
English Football League players
1921 births
2009 deaths
Association football midfielders